A Master of Theological Studies (MTS) is a graduate degree, offered in theological seminary or graduate faculty of theology, which gives students lay training in theological studies. Under Association of Theological Schools in the United States and Canada (ATS) standards, programs require graduates to have earned an accredited bachelor's degree or its equivalent. Programs usually require students to complete two years of full-time study or its equivalent to earn the degree. The degree can serve as preparation for entering a masters or doctoral program in theology (Th.D.), religion (Ph.D.), or a related subject, such as education, counseling, social sciences, or humanities.

The MTS degree should not be confused with the Master of Sacred Theology (STM) degree which is usually an additional year-long program of advanced study after the MTS or Master of Divinity (M.Div.) degree focusing on one area of special interest.

Some divinity schools and seminaries, notably Yale Divinity School, use the degree title "Master of Arts in Religion", abbreviated MAR, instead of Master of Theological Studies.

Curriculum
The MTS may require the completion of a summative evaluation, which could be a thesis or other project.  The complete standards are listed in the Association of Theological Schools in the United States and Canada ATS Program Standards for the MTS degree.

The ATS standards specify that the bulk of courses in the MTS program be academic rather than professional.

See also 

 Master of Theology (MTh.)
 Master of Sacred Theology (STM)

References
 

Christian education
Theological Studies
Religious degrees